Ivan Živanović may refer to:

Ivan Živanović (footballer, born 1981), Serbian association football player
Ivan Živanović (footballer, born 1995), Serbian association football player who plays for FK Radnički 1923